Hradčany, the Castle District, is the district of the city of Prague, Czech Republic surrounding Prague Castle.

Its history stretches back to the 9th century. St Vitus Cathedral is located in the castle area.

Most of the district consists of noble historical palaces. There are many other attractions for visitors: romantic nooks, peaceful places and beautiful lookouts.

Hradčany was an independent borough until 1784, when the four independent boroughs that had formerly constituted Prague were proclaimed a single city. The other three were Malá Strana (Lesser Quarter), Staré Město (Old Town) and Nové Město (New Town).

References

External links

 Official Website of the City of Prague
 Hradčany - Prague-wiki
Fullscreen QTVR virtual tour of Hradčany and Prague Castle

Photo gallery

 
Districts of Prague